State highway spurs in Texas are owned and maintained by the Texas Department of Transportation (TxDOT).

Spur 501

Spur 501 is located in Harris County. It runs from Business SH 146 to South Shady Lane in La Porte.

On July 28, 1977, a  section from Loop 410 at Avenue J to Spur 498 was transferred to Loop 410 (later Business SH 146).

Spur 502

Spur 502 runs from US 80 in Longview north to US 259 near Judson. It is known as Judson Road for most of its length, except for the southernmost quarter mile, where it is known as High Street. Spur 502 was designated on January 31, 1972, on its current route.

Junction list

Spur 503

Spur 503 is located in Grayson County. It runs from US 75 to US 69.

Spur 503 was designated on March 1, 1972, from then-proposed US 75 south of Denison east 1.5 miles to then-present US 75 (later Business US 75, now SH 91) along an old routing of US 75. On December 22, 1994, the road was extended to US 69, replacing a portion of Business US 75.

Spur 504

Spur 504 was designated on April 3, 1972, from the Texas/New Mexico state line at Glenrio, east and north 0.61 mile to I-40 along a portion of an old routing of US 66. Spur 504 was cancelled on June 21, 1990, and transferred to Business I-40-A.

Spur 510

Spur 510 is located in Clay County. It runs from US 82 to US 287 southeast of Henrietta.

Spur 510 was designated on August 31, 1972, on the current route along an old routing of US 287. The route is signed as US 287 Business rather than Spur 510.

Spur 511

Spur 511 is located in Montague County. It runs from an intersection with SH 101 (formerly SH 114) and FM 1749 in Sunset south to US 81/US 287. It is a former routing of US 81/US 287.

Spur 511 was designated on December 11, 1972, on its current route.

Spur 514

Spur 514 is located in Smith County. It runs from US 69 northwest of Tyler to Loop 323.

Spur 514 was designated on December 10, 1973, on the current route.

Spur 515

Spur 515 is located in Grimes County. It runs from Business SH 6-S (former Loop 508) to SH 6/SH 105.

Spur 515 was designated on February 28, 1973, on the current route as a replacement of a section of SH 105.

Spur 527

Spur 527 is located in Harris County. It runs from I-69/US 59 to Elgin Street. The route is unsigned.

Spur 527 was designated on July 30, 1976, on the current route, which was once the original routing of US 59 into Downtown Houston.

Spur 529

Spur 529 is located in Fort Bend County. It runs from I-69/US 59 to US 90A/SH 36.

Spur 529 was designated on August 30, 1976, on the current route.

Spur 535

Spur 535 is located in Kerr County. It runs from SH 27, 2.3 miles southeast of Kerrville, to a point 1.2 miles northeast.

Spur 535 was designated on May 23, 1977, from SH 27, 1.4 miles south of Kerrville, southeast 1.3 miles to Kerrville Airport. On September 26, 1979, Spur 535 was relocated to its current location due to construction at the airport.

Spur 536

Spur 536 is located in Bexar County. It runs from I-10/I-35/US 87 to I-410/US 281.

Spur 536 was designated on February 23, 1978, on the current route along an old routing of US 281, which was rerouted onto I-37. Spur 536 was proposed for decommissioning in 2014 as part of a TxDOT turnback program, but the program was rejected.

Spur 537

Spur 537 was located in San Antonio. It began at an intersection with I-410 and San Pedro Avenue in Uptown San Antonio, near North Star Mall. It followed San Pedro Avenue northbound until its terminus at the US 281 freeway, just west of the runways of San Antonio International Airport.

Spur 537 was designated on February 23, 1978, along with Spur 536, after US 281 was rerouted along the McAllister Freeway through the north side of San Antonio. The Spur 537 designation, along with those of several other routes in Bexar County, was cancelled on December 18, 2014; control was returned to the city of San Antonio as part of TxDOT's San Antonio turnback program, which gave  of roads to the city. The cancellation occurred when the project along the road was completed.

Spur 542

Spur 542 was designated on April 20, 1982, from Spur 259 (now Business US 181) east 1.2 miles to SH 72 east of Kenedy along an old routing of SH 72. On June 21, 1990, Spur 542 was cancelled and transferred to Business SH 72-B.

Spur 544

Spur 544 is located in Nueces County. It runs from SH 44 to I-37 in Corpus Christi.

Spur 544 was designated on June 18, 1996, on the current route as a replacement of Business SH 44-D.

Spur 548

Spur 548 is located in Harris County. It runs from I-610 near Hardy Street to Crosstimbers Road. The route is an unsigned portion of the Hardy Toll Road.

Spur 548 was designated on September 26, 1984, on the current route.

Spur 553

Spur 553 was designated on May 25, 1986, from I-35E at Spine Road in Lewisville, west 2.5 miles to Denton Tap Road. On May 31, 1995, the road was extended to SH 121 in Coppell and to SH 121/FM 2281 in Lewisville, forming a continuous route between Coppell and Lewisville. Spur 553 was cancelled on November 18, 1999, and became a portion of SH 121 when it was rerouted.

Spur 557

Spur 557 is located in Kaufman County. It runs from I-20 south of Terrell to US 80.

Spur 557 was designated on August 18, 1987, on the current route along an old routing of I-20.

Spur 559

Spur 559 was designated on January 28, 1987, from I-345 southeast 1.4 miles to I-45 along an old routing of US 75. On June 25, 1991, Spur 559 was cancelled and returned to the city of Dallas. The route is now the Good-Latimer Expressway.

Spur 563

Spur 563 was located in Ellis County. It was the former alignment of US 75 through Ennis. It is now Business I-45.

Spur 565

Spur 565 was designated on January 28, 1987, from Loop 564 (now Business I-45) in Corsicana southeast 0.9 mile to I-45/US 287 along an old routing of US 287. On June 21, 1990, Spur 565 was cancelled and transferred to Business US 287-T.

Spur 572

Spur 572 is located in Panola County. It runs from Business US 59-D to US 79/SH 149 in Carthage.

Spur 572 was designated on October 28, 1987, as a replacement for SH 149, which was rerouted along Loop 436 west of Carthage.

Spur 575

Spur 575 is located in Garza County. It runs from US 84 and East 15th Street in Post to FM 651.

Spur 575 was designated on December 21, 1988, on the current route.

Spur 576

Spur 576 is located in Upton County. It runs from US 67 in Rankin to SH 349.

Spur 576 was designated on August 30, 1988, on the current route.

Spur 579

Spur 579 is located in Hill County. It runs from I-35 northeast of Hillsboro to SH 81.

Spur 579 was designated on March 26, 1991, on the current route.

Spur 580

Spur 580 is located in Tarrant County. It runs from US 377 to I-30 in Fort Worth.

Spur 580 was designated on August 28, 1991, on the current route along an old routing of US 80.

Spur 581

Spur 581 is located in Frio County. It begins at I-35/FM 1583 in Derby. The highway runs to the north, paralleling both I-35 and a line of the Missouri Pacific Railroad, crossing the rail line north of Derby near County Road 3410. South of County Road 3201, Spur 581 passes by McKinley Field before entering Pearsall. Just north of the Pearsall city limits, the highway has an intersection with FM 1582. Spur 581 runs north through town on Oak Street before ending at an intersection with Business I-35/FM 140 near the town square.

Spur 581 was designated on March 26, 1991, along the current route. Its mileage was transferred from US 81 when that highway was decommissioned south of Fort Worth.

Spur 588

Spur 588 is located in Ector and Midland counties. It runs from SH 191 to I-20 Business.

Spur 588 was designated on April 26, 1989, on the current route.

Spur 589

Spur 589 was designated om March 28, 1989, from US 281 to US 59 in George West along an old routing of US 59. On June 21, 1990, Spur 589 was cancelled and transferred to Business US 59-X.

Spur 591

Spur 591 is located in Potter County. It runs from Loop 335 to Folsom Road in Amarillo.

Spur 591 was designated on October 27, 1989, on the current route.

Spur 594

Spur 594 is located in Bowie County. It runs from I-30, 1.4 miles west of FM 560, to US 82 and serves the Red River Army Depot.

Spur 594 was designated on January 26, 2006, on the current route.

Spur 600

Spur 600 is located in Hidalgo County. It runs from US 281/US 281 Spur/Spur 241 south to the Pharr-Reynosa International Bridge.

Spur 600 was designated on April 27, 1995, on the current route.

Spur 601

Spur 601 is located in El Paso County. It runs from US 54 to Loop 375.

Spur 601 was designated on August 24, 2006, on the current route.

Spur 729

Spur 729 is located in Guthrie in King County. Its eastern terminus is at an at-grade intersection with US 83 near the buildings of the Guthrie Common School District. The short route travels to the west along 6th Street, ending at a barricaded dead end.

Spur 729 was designated on July 26, 2007, after TxDOT rerouted US 82/SH 114 around Guthrie. Originally, US 82 entered Guthrie from the west and was duplexed with US 83 southbound for approximately  before the two routes separated past the South Wichita River bridge. The concurrency was eliminated with the construction of the US 82 bypass to the west of Guthrie and the upgrading of the southern intersection of the two highways to an interchange. Spur 729 is a section of the former US 82 into Guthrie, while the remaining portion of the former route was deleted from the state highway system.

Previously, the roadway extended beyond the current western terminus and functioned as a ramp to westbound US 82; this ramp was eventually obliterated, as originally proposed by TxDOT to AASHTO, though its footprint is still visible past the barricades and fencing.

Spur 1966

Spur 1966 is located in El Paso County. It runs from US 85 to Schuster Avenue.

Spur 1966 was designated on February 23, 2012, as Spur 73, but to avoid confusion, it was changed to Spur 1966 on March 29, 2012. The number was chosen to honor the NCAA championship won by the 1965–66 Texas Western Miners men's basketball team.

References

+5
State highway spurs 500
State highway spurs 500